Jalan Wang Kelian, Federal Route 226 (formerly Perlis State Route R15), is a federal road in Perlis, Malaysia. It is also a main route to Wang Prachan and Satun, Thailand via Wang Prachan Road (National highway 4184). Jalan Wang Kelian is notorious for its narrow and dangerous sharp corners. The Kilometre Zero of the Federal Route 226 starts at the Malaysia-Thailand border near Wang Kelian Checkpoint, Perlis.

In 2008, the road was gazetted as the federal roads by JKR as Federal Route 226.

Features

At most sections, the Federal Route 226 was built under the JKR R5 road standard, allowing maximum speed limit of up to 90 km/h.

List of junctions

References

Malaysian Federal Roads